Lough is a surname of Scottish or Irish origin, meaning lake. The name refers to:

David Lough (born 1986), American baseball player
Dorian Lough (contemporary), British actor
Ernest Lough (1911–2000), English boy soprano
John Francis Burnaby Lumley Lough, Reverend (1832-1896), Bermudian, Rector of St. Peter's Church, St. George's, Bermuda (a UNESCO World Heritage Site)
John Graham Lough (1789–1867), English sculptor
John Robert Stuart Lough, Brigadier (1887-1970), Canadian, Commanding Officer Seaforth Highlanders of Canada, Commanding Officer Group A, D, E & G Canadian Reinforcement Units, England (1943-1944) 
Maxon S. Lough, a brigadier-general in the U.S. Army.
Peter Lough (born 1975), Canadian professional lacrosse player
Rodney Lough Jr. (born 1960), American Wilderness Photographer
Thomas Lough (1850–1922), Irish-British politician; MP 1892–1918
Thomas Lough (1801-1877), Roaming Artist, Poet and Musician (fiddle); Blacksmith; Brother of John Graham Lough, English Sculptor 
William H. Lough (1881-1940s), American economist
Michael Lough (born 1975), Rugby Union player for Preston Grasshoppers and Australia Rugby Sevens

See also
Loch  (surname)